This is a list of films which have placed number one at the weekend box office in Spain during 2011.

Highest-grossing films

See also
 List of Spanish films — Spanish films by year

References

2011
Box
Spain